Kołczygłówki is a non-operational PKP railway station in Kołczygłówki (Pomeranian Voivodeship), Poland.

Lines crossing the station

References 
Kołczygłówki article at Polish Stations Database, URL accessed at 29 March 2006

Railway stations in Pomeranian Voivodeship
Disused railway stations in Pomeranian Voivodeship
Bytów County